The Dokdo-class amphibious assault ship is a class of landing platform helicopter (LPH) and amphibious assault ships operated by the Republic of Korea Navy (ROKN). Designed and built by Hanjin Heavy Industries (HHIC), the amphibious landing ships were meant to enhance South Korea's amphibious operation capability, both in terms of assault and military operations other than war (MOOTW).

Development
The ROK Navy required a versatile landing ship with amphibious capabilities in its program to build a blue-water navy. In the end, Hanjin's Dokdo design was chosen to fulfill this need. The  — also built by HHIC — was chosen as the landing craft air cushion (LCAC) to operate from the ship.

Specifications

The LPX is an amphibious warfare ship which includes a well deck to accommodate amphibious assault vehicles (AAVs) and two LCAC, the first of which (LSF 631) was acquired in April 2007.

As a high-speed amphibious ship, the LPX was based on the concept of "over-the-horizon assault." As the name indicates, the "over-the-horizon assault" comprises a military operation in which an amphibious landing is conducted with high-speed air-cushioned vehicles and helicopters from beyond the horizon, where they cannot be easily detected or attacked by the enemy. The conventional landing ship tank (LST) has to approach the coastline for landing, at the risk of being fired upon by the enemy.

The LPX has a carrying limit of 720 marines (+300 crew members), 10 tanks, 10 trucks, 7 AAVs, three field artillery pieces, and two LCAC hovercraft capable of landing on enemy shores doing —a mix that enables it to launch troop landings from both sea and air. It can also carry 10 helicopters when there are no ground vehicles on its hangar deck.

The flight surface is also sprayed with urethane, which can support VTOL jets, like Harriers. South Korea is considering the purchase of F-35B fighters to operate from its Dokdo-class ships. Currently, the LPX operates mainly UH-1H and UH-60P. However, both of these are designed for land‐based operations and lack abilities for ship-borne operations such as protection against damage from salty breezes, making them difficult to operate on-board continuously. The KUH-Amphibious, the sea-based amphibious variant of the KAI Surion, is now under development. Production is planned to commence in late 2015 with some 40 helicopters planned.

Self-defense armament includes the RIM-116 Rolling Airframe Missile system. The Goalkeeper close-in weapon system (CIWS) was purchased in January 2003 from Thales, at a pre-set price of 13,000,000,000 won (roughly $15,000,000).

The second ship of the class, Marado, was built with some changes compared to Dokdo. The flight deck is adapted to accommodate two V-22 Ospreys, while Dokdo was able to only carry one. In place of the Thales SMART-L multibeam radar and MW08 surveillance radar, Marado uses the Elta Systems EL/M-2248 MF-STAR multifunction surveillance radar and LIG Nex1 SPS-550K 3-D air and surface surveillance radar. It also has a different weapons suite than the 30 mm Goalkeeper and RAM, instead using two 20 mm Phalanx CIWS and having a K-VLS at the rear of the superstructure for the locally developed K-SAAM.

Dokdo is similar in size to the light aircraft carriers derived from the Sea Control Ship, such as the Spanish Navy's former aircraft carrier  and the Royal Thai Navy's .

Ships in the class

Plans 

Some proposed uses for the ship include UN peacekeeping operations and disaster relief.

The Korean news agency Yonhap reported in December 2017 that the Korean military was considering operating F-35B aircraft from the Dokdo-class amphibious assault ships. But as of December 2022, no such plans have been officially declared.

First steps to a blue water navy 
In a speech delivered in March 2001, the then South Korean President Kim Dae Jung stated that his administration was aiming to build a navy that "will defend the national interests in the five oceans and perform a role in defending world peace."

By the year 2020, the ROK Navy plans to deploy two to three rapid response fleets, each comprising 1 Dokdo class, 2 Sejong the Great class, 4 Chungmugong Yi Sun-sin class, 1 Gwanggaeto the Great class,  severals, and 2 or 3 Type 214 submarines.

ROK Navy's Rapid Response Fleet:
 Dokdo-class LPH (flagship)
  (KDX-III) Aegis Combat System
 
 
 
 Type 214 submarine (diesel-electric)

References

External links
 Dokdo class LPH - ROK Navy
 Global security article on the LP-X
 LPX Doko launching ceremony pictures
  Naval Technology entry for the Dokdo class
https://namu.wiki/w/%EB%8F%85%EB%8F%84%EA%B8%89%20%EB%8C%80%ED%98%95%EC%88%98%EC%86%A1%ED%95%A8?from=%EB%8F%85%EB%8F%84%EA%B8%89%20%EA%B0%95%EC%8A%B5%EC%83%81%EB%A5%99%ED%95%A8

Helicopter carrier classes
Amphibious warfare vessel classes
Amphibious warfare vessels of the Republic of Korea Navy
 Dokdo class landing platform experimental ships
 Dokdo class landing platform experimental ships